Uglichsky District  is an administrative and municipal district (raion), one of the seventeen in Yaroslavl Oblast, Russia. It is located in the southwest of the oblast. Its administrative center is the town of Uglich (which is not administratively a part of the district). Population: 13,255 (2010 Census);

Administrative and municipal status
Within the framework of administrative divisions, Uglichsky District is one of the seventeen in the oblast. The town of Uglich serves as its administrative center, despite being incorporated separately as a town of oblast significance—an administrative unit with the status equal to that of the districts.

As a municipal division, the district is incorporated as Uglichsky Municipal District, with the town of oblast significance of Uglich being incorporated within it as Uglich Urban Settlement.

References

Notes

Sources

Districts of Yaroslavl Oblast
 
